The Taymyr Peninsula is a peninsula in the Far North of Russia, in the Siberian Federal District, that forms the northernmost part of the mainland of Eurasia. Administratively it is part of the Krasnoyarsk Krai Federal subject of Russia.

Geography
The Taymyr Peninsula lies between the Yenisei Gulf of the Kara Sea and the Khatanga Gulf of the Laptev Sea.

Lake Taymyr and the Byrranga Mountains are located within the vast Taymyr Peninsula.

Cape Chelyuskin, the northernmost point of the Afro-Eurasian continent, is located at the northern end of the Taymyr Peninsula.

Population

The Nenets people, also known as Samoyeds, are an indigenous people in northern arctic Russia, and some live at the Taymyr Peninsula.

The Nganasan people are an indigenous Samoyedic people inhabiting central Siberia, including the Taymyr Peninsula. In the Russian Federation, they are recognized as being one of the Indigenous peoples of the Russian North. They reside primarily in the settlements of Ust-Avam, Volachanka, and Novaya in the Taymyrsky Dolgano-Nenetsky District of Krasnoyarsk Krai, with smaller populations residing in the towns of Dudinka and Norilsk as well. The isolated location of the Nganasan people enabled them to maintain shamanistic practices even in the 20th century.

Economy
MMC Norilsk Nickel conducts mining operations in the area. The company conducts smelting operations in the area of the city of Norilsk, near the peninsula. The nickel ore concentrate and other products of the company are transported over a short railroad to the port city of Dudinka on the Yenisei River, and from there by boat to Murmansk and other ports.

Ecology

The peninsula is the site of the last known naturally occurring muskox outside of North America, which died out about 2,000 years ago. They were successfully reintroduced in 1975. The population grew to 2,500 animals in 2002 increasing to 6,500 in 2010.

Study in 2021 found that based on eDNA, woolly mammoths survived on the Taymyr Peninsula until 3,900 to 4,100 years ago, roughly concurrent with the Wrangel population. The Taymyr Peninsula, with its drier habitat, may have served as a refugium for the mammoth steppe, supporting mammoths and other widespread Ice Age mammals such as wild horses (Equus sp.).

Climate
The coasts of the Taymyr Peninsula are frozen most of the year, between September and June on average. The summer season is short, especially on the shores of the Laptev Sea in the northeast. The climate in the interior of the peninsula is continental - Tundra Climate (ET). Winters are harsh, with frequent blizzards and extremely low temperatures. The following data for Cape Chelyuskin provides an indication of the weather experienced in the northern part of the peninsula.

See also
 Siberia
 Taymyr Strait

References

Bibliography
  (The title means “Shamans in Eurasia”, the book is written in Hungarian, but it is published also in German, Estonian and Finnish: Site of publisher with short description on the book (in Hungarian) .)

External links

 Taymyr Peninsula photographs

Peninsulas of Russia
Landforms of Severnaya Zemlya